Zypliai Manor is a former Tyszkiewicz residential manor in Tubeliai village, Šakiai District Municipality, Lithuania.

References

Manor houses in Lithuania